Diplogrammus goramensis, or Goram dragonet is a species of tropical marine fish in the dragonet family, Callionymidae. It is native to the western Pacific Ocean from China to Fiji.

Description
A small fish, with maximum recorded size of about 6 cm. There is a longitudinal fold of skin along the side below the lateral line, and the operculum has a free flap of skin. In Males the first dorsal spine is an elongated filament. The head has brown bars and blue vertical lines. The sides are brown mottled irregularly with white and have brown bars that extend to the belly. The first dorsal fin has oblique bands and the other fins are mottled with brown and white spots.

Distribution
China to Fiji.

Habitat

References

External links
 

G
Fish described in 1858
Fish of East Asia
Fish of Oceania